The Seward Mountains are isolated mountains, 1,525 m, standing 10 miles east-southeast (ESE) of the Buttress Nunataks and a like distance east of George VI Sound on the west coast of Palmer Land.

The Seward Mountains were discovered in 1936 by the British Graham Land Expedition (BGLE) under John Riddoch Rymill. The Seward Mountains were named by John Riddoch Rymill for Sir Albert Seward, professor of botany at Cambridge, 1906–1936.

References

Mountain ranges of Palmer Land